Dercetoides (meaning "resemblant of the throat whale") is a genus of prehistoric ray-finned fish.

References
http://paleodb.org/cgi-bin/bridge.pl?action=checkTaxonInfo&taxon_no=35562&is_real_user=1

Prehistoric aulopiformes
Prehistoric ray-finned fish genera